1994 is a year.

1994 may also refer to:
 1994 (number)
 1994 (album), a 1994 album by Merle Haggard
 1994, a 2019 album by Skambankt
 "1994" (song), a 2013 song recorded by Jason Aldean
 "1994", a 2008 song by les Cowboys Frigants from Sur un air de déjà vu
 "1994", a 2018 song by Alec Benjamin
 Nineteen Ninety-Four, a BBC Radio 4 comedy series
 Nineteen Ninety-Four (album), a 1994 album by Alvin Lee
 1994 (Italian TV series), a 2019 Sky Atlantic TV series
 1994 (Mexican TV series), a 2019 Netflix TV series
 1994 a documentary about 1994 in Mexico including Colosio's assassination